Black Brook is a tributary of the Passaic River that flows through the Great Swamp National Wildlife Refuge in Morris County, New Jersey, in the United States. Black Brook rises at the north east base of Long Hill, Chatham Township, Morris County, flows westerly along the hill, by a course of 7 or 8 miles to its recipient in Morris Township, New Jersey. Due to the chemical fertilizer usage in nearby areas, Black Brook has the second worst water quality after Loantaka Brook.

See also
List of rivers of New Jersey

References

Rivers of Morris County, New Jersey
Tributaries of the Passaic River
Rivers of New Jersey